Datuk Wira Mohd Anuar bin Mohd Tahir (Jawi: محمد انوار بن محمد طاهر) is a Malaysian politician who served as Deputy Minister of Works in the Pakatan Harapan (PH) administration under former Prime Minister Mahathir Mohamad and former Minister Baru Bian from July 2018 to the collapse of the PH administration in February 2020 and Member of Parliament (MP) for Temerloh from May 2018 to November 2022. He is a member of the National Trust Party (AMANAH), a component party of the PH opposition coalition and was a member of the Malaysian Islamic Party (PAS), then component party of the Pakatan Rakyat (PR) opposition coalition, the People's Justice Party (PKR), then component party of the Barisan Alternatif (BA) opposition coalition as well as the United Malays National Organisation (UMNO), a component party of the ruling Barisan Nasional (BN) coalition. He also served as the 1st and founding Secretary-General of AMANAH from September 2015 to December 2019.

Educations
Mohd Anuar was born in 1952 at Beseri, Perlis, and received his early education at Sekolah Kebangsaan (SK) Beseri. He studied and graduated his bachelor's degree in Business Administration at MARA Institute of Technology (ITM). He later obtained his master's degree in Sociology at Morehead State University, United States (1985–1986).

During his time as a student at ITM, Mohd Anuar started involving in youth Non-governmental organizations (NGO) like Muslim Youth Movement of Malaysia (ABIM) and others.

Politics
Mohd Anuar was a United Malays National Organisation (UMNO) before quits following dismissal of Anwar Ibrahim from the party in 1998. He was then appointed as the first secretary general of People's Justice Party (KeADILan) in 1999, but somehow he shifted by joining Pan-Malaysian Islamic Party (PAS) in 2003 and was selected as a Central Working Committee member of PAS.

However Mohd Anuar was one of the moderate and progressive PAS leaders referred to as G18 who were ousted at the 2015 PAS leadership election that led them to launch the new splinter party, AMANAH with Mohd Anuar as its first secretary general.

Elections
Mohd Anuar made his debut contesting in the 1999 general election as a KeADILan candidate the parliamentary seat of Padang Besar, Perlis. He also contested before the Perlis State Legislative Assembly seats of Beseri in the 2004 general election, Bintong in the 2008 general election and Santan in the 2013 general election representing PAS. But he lost in all his attempts until he contested and won in the 2018 general election the parliamentary seat of Temerloh in Pahang as an AMANAH candidate.

Election results

Honours
  :
  Knight Commander of the Order of Malacca (DCSM) – Datuk Wira (2019)

See also 
Seventh Mahathir cabinet

References

Living people
1952 births
People from Perlis
Malaysian people of Malay descent
Malaysian Muslims
National Trust Party (Malaysia) politicians
Former Malaysian Islamic Party politicians
Former People's Justice Party (Malaysia) politicians
Former United Malays National Organisation politicians
Members of the Dewan Rakyat
Government ministers of Malaysia
21st-century Malaysian politicians